Gantz is a manga series created by Hiroya Oku, later adapted into an anime and two live action films.

Gantz may also refer to:

Persons
 Timothy Gantz (1946–2004), classical scholar
 Benny Gantz (born 1959), Israeli military leader and politician of the Israel Resilience Party
 Israel Gantz (born 1978), Head of the Mateh Binyamin Regional Council

Other
 Gantz, a character from the Klonoa series who is known as "Guntz" in Japan and Europe
 Gantz Homestead, a historical farm house in Grove City, Ohio
 Gantz (film), a 2011 series of live-action Japanese science fiction films

See also 
 Ganz (disambiguation)
 Gant (disambiguation)
 Gantt (disambiguation)
 Gans (disambiguation)